Stenarctia is a genus of moths in the subfamily Arctiinae erected by Per Olof Christopher Aurivillius in 1899.

Species
Stenarctia abdominalis
Stenarctia griseipennis
Stenarctia quadripunctata
Stenarctia rothi

References

External links

Arctiini
Moth genera